The 2022 Arkansas–Pine Bluff Golden Lions football team represented University of Arkansas at Pine Bluff as a member of the Southwestern Athletic Conference (SWAC) during the 2022 NCAA Division I FCS football season. They were led through the first seven games of the season by head coach Doc Gamble, who was in his third season with the program, until he was fired on October 20, with offensive coordinator Don Treadwell assuming interim head coaching duties for the remainder of the season. The Lions played their home games at Simmons Bank Field in Pine Bluff, Arkansas.

Schedule
Arkansas–Pine Bluff finalized their 2022 schedule on March 16, 2022.

Notes

References

Arkansas-Pine Bluff Golden Lions
Arkansas–Pine Bluff Golden Lions football seasons
Arkansas-Pine Bluff Golden Lions